Nightmare in the Daylight is a 1992 American made-for-television thriller film directed by Lou Antonio, starring Jaclyn Smith and Christopher Reeve. It premiered on CBS on November 22, 1992.

Plot 
Sean Farrell (Reeve) is a lawyer working in San Francisco, who in the past beat his long-lost wife, Jean, who disappeared in the 1985 Mexico City earthquake. One day, he notices Megan Lambert (Smith), a Wisconsin teacher visiting the city with her husband Peter (Mason) and son Jamie (Bell). He grows convinced that Megan is his wife, and ignores any denials she is making. After kidnapping her for a short period of time, he contacts his first wife's father, who tells Sean that Megan is not his daughter. Sean, by now, is too obsessed with Megan though, resulting in the woman and her family living in constant fear.

Cast
Jaclyn Smith as Megan Lambert
Christopher Reeve as Sean Farrell
Tom Mason as Peter Lambert
Glynnis O'Connor as Sloan Evans
Christina Pickles as Sarah Jenner
Eric Bell as Jamie Lambert
John Ingle as Walter Scripps

Production
The film was shot in San Francisco and Los Angeles.

Reception
Variety wrote of the film: "The game-playing limps on, with Smith distressed and Reeve looking severe as though they'd both just read the script. Smith and Mason play well through some good naturalistic domestic scenes, but that doesn't much help the cause. By the end of the caper, Nightmare in the Daylight affirms the purposelessness of the venture. Tech credits are swell, with Michael Paul Clausen's production design a plus."

References

External links

1992 television films
1992 films
CBS network films
Films set in San Francisco
Films shot in Los Angeles
Films shot in San Francisco
Films about missing people
1990s thriller drama films
American thriller drama films
American thriller television films
1992 drama films
Films directed by Lou Antonio
American drama television films
1990s American films